Philo Township is a township in Champaign County, Illinois, USA.  As of the 2020 census, its population was 1,897 and it contained 762 housing units.

History
Philo Township changed its name from Hale Township on April 30, 1860.

Geography
Philo is Township 18 North, Range 9 East of the Third Principal Meridian.

Cities and towns
 Philo

Cemeteries
The township contains these cemeteries: Calvary, Captain Davidson, Locust Grove (Section 22) and Loeffler.

Grain elevators
Philo elevator (Section 22) was built along the Wabash—Norfolk Southern railroad.

Major highways
  Illinois State Route 130

Demographics
As of the 2020 census there were 1,897 people, 714 households, and 582 families residing in the township. The racial makeup of the township was 94.31% White, 0.42% African American, 0.16% Native American, 0.69% Asian, 0.21% Pacific Islander, 0.84% from other races, and 3.37% from two or more races. Hispanic or Latino of any race were 1.11% of the population.

There were 714 households, out of which 31.80% had children under the age of 18 living with them, 73.53% were married couples living together, 7.98% had a female householder with no spouse present, and 18.49% were non-families. 14.80% of all households were made up of individuals, and 9.10% had someone living alone who was 65 years of age or older. The average household size was 2.90 and the average family size was 3.19.

The township's age distribution consisted of 20.6% under the age of 18, 10.1% from 18 to 24, 30.7% from 25 to 44, 27.2% from 45 to 64, and 11.4% who were 65 years of age or older. The median age was 36.6 years. For every 100 females, there were 97.7 males. For every 100 females age 18 and over, there were 100.0 males.

The median income for a household in the township was $96,818, and the median income for a family was $106,528. Males had a median income of $52,639 versus $53,500 for females. The per capita income for the township was $41,400. About 2.4% of families and 3.5% of the population were below the poverty line, including 7.9% of those under age 18 and 2.9% of those age 65 or over.

References
 
 United States Census Bureau cartographic boundary files

External links
 US-Counties.com
 City-Data.com
 Illinois State Archives

Townships in Champaign County, Illinois
Townships in Illinois
1859 establishments in Illinois
Populated places established in 1859